Theresa Gaasterland is an American politician and scientist. She is a Professor of Computational Biology and Genomics and Director of the Scripps Genome Center at the University of California, San Diego (UCSD). She was elected a Fellow of the  International Society for Computational Biology (ISCB) in 2018 for outstanding contributions to the fields of computational biology and bioinformatics.

She was elected to the city council of Del Mar, California in 2018, and the city council elected her to be the city's mayor. The position of mayor of Del Mar rotates among the city councilmembers. During her seventeen years as a Del Mar resident before running for office, she served on the city's finance and sea level rise advisory committees. She served a year as mayor, until, in 2022, the position of mayor was passed to fellow city councilmember Dwight Worden.

References

Living people
American bioinformaticians
Year of birth missing (living people)